

This is a list of the Indiana state historical markers in Warrick County.

This is intended to be a detailed table of the official state historical marker placed in Warrick County, Indiana, United States by the Indiana Historical Bureau. The location of the historical marker and its latitude and longitude coordinates are included below when available, along with its name, year of placement, and topics as recorded by the Historical Bureau.  There is 1 historical marker located in Warrick County.

Historical markers

See also
List of Indiana state historical markers
National Register of Historic Places listings in Warrick County, Indiana

References

External links
Indiana Historical Marker Program
Indiana Historical Bureau

Warrick County
Historical markers